Acrocercops triscalma is a moth of the family Gracillariidae. It is known from India (Karnataka).

The larvae feed on Moullava spicata. They probably mine the leaves of their host plant.

References

triscalma
Moths described in 1916
Moths of Asia